Stephansplatz station is a metro station served by Hamburg U-Bahn line U1. It is located at Stephansplatz in the Neustadt (New Town) quarter of Hamburg.

History
The station was opened on 2 June 1929 and refurbished in 1972.

The platform was fully renovated from 2015 to 2016. It was partly heightened to facilitate easier access of disabled persons to the trains. A lift was added and opened on 30 May 2016.

Location  
Stephansplatz is an important junction on the Hamburg Wallring. Within walking distance lie Hamburg Dammtor station, the Messe ground and Congress Center Hamburg.

See also 

 List of Hamburg U-Bahn stations

References

External links
 Stephansplatz at Hamburger-untergrundbahn.de 
 Line and route network plans at hvv.de 

Hamburg U-Bahn stations in Hamburg
U1 (Hamburg U-Bahn) stations
Buildings and structures in Hamburg-Mitte
Railway stations in Germany opened in 1929